The Iranian worm snake (Xerotyphlops wilsoni) is a species of snake in the family Typhlopidae. The species is endemic to Iran.

Etymology
The specific name, wilsoni, is in honor of Arnold Talbot Wilson, who was a British military officer, diplomat, and amateur naturalist.

Reproduction
X. wilsoni is oviparous.

References

Further reading
Hedges SB, Marion AB, Lipp KM, Marin J, Vidal N (2014). " A taxonomic framework for typhlopid snakes from the Caribbean and other regions (Reptilia, Squamata)". Caribbean Herpetology (49): 1-61. (Xerotyphlops wilsoni, new combination).
Wall F (1908). "Notes on a collection of Snakes from Persia". Journal of the  Bombay Natural History Society 18: 795–805. (Typhlops wilsoni, new species, p. 796).

Xerotyphlops
Endemic fauna of Iran
Reptiles described in 1908